Michael Edward Love (born March 15, 1941) is an American singer and songwriter who co-founded the Beach Boys with his cousins Brian, Dennis, and Carl Wilson and their friend Al Jardine. Characterized by his nasal tenor and occasional bass-baritone singing, Love has been one of the band's vocalists and lyricists for their entire career, contributing to each of their studio albums and serving as their frontman for live performances. During the mid-1960s, he was one of Brian's main collaborators, contributing lyrics to hit records such as "Fun, Fun, Fun" (1964), "I Get Around" (1964), "Help Me, Rhonda" (1965), "California Girls" (1965), and "Good Vibrations" (1966).

Drawing inspiration from Chuck Berry and Felice and Boudleaux Bryant, Love's lyrics primarily reflected the youth culture of surfing, cars, and romance, which helped fashion pop culture's perception of the "California Dream".  Love also had a significant role in the Beach Boys' vocal arrangements – particularly the doo-wop element in their sound. Starting in 1968, Love was a student of Transcendental Meditation (TM) under Maharishi Mahesh Yogi, and became a TM teacher in 1971. The experience influenced his lyrics to take on themes of astrology, meditation, politics and ecology. In the late 1970s, Love fronted Celebration, a short-lived band that consisted of Beach Boys touring musicians, and began working on solo albums, releasing his first in 1981, Looking Back with Love.

Love is often vilified by fans and critics due to his history of conflicts with his bandmates, a characterization he has disputed. Many of his contributions to the group's hits were not officially recognized until the 1990s, when he sued Brian for writing credits on 35 songs. Love remains uncredited for another 44 Beach Boys songs he alleged to have co-written. Following Carl's death in 1998, the band members and their corporation, Brother Records, Inc., granted Love an exclusive license to tour under the Beach Boys' name. Since then, Love has maintained a near-constant touring regimen with his edition of the group, and has released three more solo albums. He has not performed with Brian since their 2012 reunion tour.

Love's honors include an induction into the Rock and Roll Hall of Fame as a member of the Beach Boys in 1988. Beyond music, he has taken part in projects to promote international charities related to such subjects as environmentalism, juvenile diabetes, and music education.

Background

Michael Edward Love's mother, Emily (known as "Glee") Wilson (1919〜79), was the sister of Mary and Murry Wilson, a resident of Los Angeles since the early 1920s. Glee married Edward Milton Love (1918〜2013), the son of the founder of the Love Sheet Metal Company, in 1938. Mike Love, the first of their six children, was born in the Baldwin Hills district of Los Angeles in 1941. Thereafter the family moved to the upmarket View Park area. He attended Dorsey High School and graduated in 1959. Unsure of a career direction, Love pumped gas and briefly joined his father's company, whose fortunes dramatically declined in the late 1950s. Both Milt and Glee Love were active in sports, and Love's younger brother Stan Love later played in the National Basketball Association. Glee had a distinct interest in painting and the arts. Like her brother, Murry, however, she was also strong-willed and, according to her husband, a dominant personality. The family was close-knit and regularly socialized with Murry and his family. Murry was a part-time songwriter.

Love often sang at family get-togethers at his cousins, the Wilsons', home in nearby Hawthorne, especially at Christmas. It was here, under the vocal harmony guidance of Brian Wilson, that the Beach Boys sound was established, predominantly influenced by Brian's devotion to the Four Freshmen's arrangements. Musical accompaniment during this formative phase was solely Brian's self-taught piano, but this was quickly expanded by the guitar contributions of Brian's college friend Al Jardine (whose fundamental interest was folk music) and Carl Wilson (whose idol was Chuck Berry). With the failure of Love Sheet Metal, the family was forced to move to a modest two-bedroom house in Inglewood, closer to the Wilsons.

Career

Formation of the Beach Boys

Love played rudimentary saxophone in the first years of the fledgling garage band that evolved from the Pendletones to the Beach Boys. He also established himself, along with neighbor Gary Usher, local DJ Roger Christian, and others, as a collaborator with Brian Wilson in the band's original compositions. To help write many of the Beach Boys songs, Love drew inspiration from the lyrics of Chuck Berry along with Felice and Boudleaux Bryant, who wrote many of the Everly Brothers' songs including "Devoted to You" and "All I Have to Do is Dream". He explained, "They were both the fun, descriptive pictorial vignettes as well as the more sweet, romantic and devotional lyrics. ... Even before that and more fundamental than that, I was always into poetry."

Carl Wilson commented that, "It's not widely known, but Michael had a hand in a lot of the arrangements. He would bring out the funkier approaches, whether to go shoo-boo-bop or bom-bom-did-di-did-did. It makes a big difference, because it can change the whole rhythm, the whole color and tone of it." He also credited Love, an avid fan of doo-wop combos, with influencing Brian to listen to black R&B records. Writer Geoffrey Himes claimed that without "Mike's R&B influence ... Brian couldn’t have possibly become 'Brian Wilson.'"

Stylistic shifts and creative disputes

In early 1964, Brian Wilson shifted the Beach Boys away from beach-themed music. That November, Love told a Melody Maker reporter that he and his bandmates wanted to look beyond surf music and avoid living in the past or resting on the band's laurels. He is also credited with naming their album Pet Sounds (1966). Asked for his favorite Beach Boys album in a 1994 interview, Love responded, "I guess Pet Sounds ... because of the orchestrations and arrangement. Because it's not just about cars or girls or school, but it's about feelings."

Conversely, Love has also been reported as resisting the group's new direction. In the description of music journalist Erik Hedegaard, Love gathered a reputation as "one of the biggest assholes in the history of rock & roll" due to such accusations. Love commented in a 2007 interview,

Similarly, Love dismissed most of the reported claims about his reservations with the Smile album: "I never said anything bad about any of the tracks. I admit to wanting to make a commercially successful pop record, so I might have complained about some of the lyrics on Smile". In 1970, Love stated in Pop Chronicles that Smile was "good stuff" and "a fantastically-produced album", adding that "it'll come out, eventually." Brian said that the collapse of Smile was not due to Love's opposition to the lyrics. However, Van Dyke Parks, the album's lyricist, blamed Love with putting "a stop" on the album. In a 1971 Rolling Stone article, business associate David Anderle quoted Love saying, "Don't fuck with the formula". Over the ensuing years, the quote was repeated in myriad books, articles, websites, and blogs. Anderle later said that his statement about "the formula" had been misinterpreted. Love returned to co-writing with Brian for the Beach Boys' December 1967 album Wild Honey, the group's first foray into R&B.

Love stated in 1978 that the group's unhappiness with Capitol's promotional efforts had led them to change record companies in the late 1960s. "They promoted us very well for the first four or five years, then they failed ... in promoting the change, which would have been very commercially sensible on their part, but they didn't ever do it. In '68 or '69, they were still promoting us as the number one surfing group in the USA. How relevant was that after 'Good Vibrations', Pet Sounds, Smiley Smile or Vietnam and everything else?" In his 2016 memoir, he wrote that, unlike Brian, he was never concerned about being taken seriously by critics, and felt that detractors of their early songs showed "elitism at its worst: because so many people loved our music, there must be something wrong with it."

Rishikesh and Transcendental Meditation

In late 1967, Love became one of the many rock musicians who discovered the teachings of Maharishi Mahesh Yogi following the Beatles' public endorsement of his Transcendental Meditation (TM) technique in August 1967. In December, Love and his bandmates attended a lecture by the Maharishi at a UNICEF Variety Gala in Paris, and were moved by the simplicity and effectiveness of his meditation process as a means to obtaining inner peace. In January 1968, the Beach Boys attended the Maharishi's public appearances in New York and Cambridge, Massachusetts, after which he invited Love to join the Beatles at his training seminar in Rishikesh in northern India. Love stayed there from February 28 to March 15. He later claimed to help Paul McCartney with the lyrics of "Back in the U.S.S.R.", recorded for the Beatles' White Album (1968).

While in Rishikesh, Love planned a U.S. concert tour that would feature the Beach Boys and the Maharishi as co-headliners. The tour begun in May 1968 ended abruptly after five shows due to the disappointing audience numbers and the Maharishi's subsequent withdrawal to fulfill film contracts. In his 2016 autobiography, Love wrote: "I take responsibility for an idea that didn't work. But I don't regret it. I thought I could do some good for people who were lost, confused, or troubled, particularly those who were young and idealistic but also vulnerable, and I thought that was true for a whole bunch of us." Despite the ignominy of the tour, the Beach Boys remained ardent supporters of the Maharishi and TM. Love became a TM initiator in 1972 and later progressed to more advanced levels such as the TM-Sidhi Course.

Other work, "Kokomo", and credits lawsuit

Throughout the 1970s and 1980s, Love wrote the words and music of several Beach Boys songs, including "Big Sur" (1973), "Everyone's in Love with You" (1976) and "Sumahama" (1978). In 1978, he co-founded the band Celebration, which achieved the U.S. Top 30 hit single "Almost Summer" (co-written with Brian Wilson and Jardine). In 1981, he released his first solo album, Looking Back with Love (1981), with production by Curt Boettcher.

In 1988, the Beach Boys had a U.S. number 1 hit with "Kokomo", the only number 1 the band achieved without Brian's involvement. Love (along with "Kokomo" co-writers Scott McKenzie, Terry Melcher, and John Phillips) was nominated for a Golden Globe Award (1988) in the Original Song category, and was nominated for a Grammy Award, for "Kokomo". Also in 1988, Love was inducted into the Rock and Roll Hall of Fame along with the other founding members of the Beach Boys. At the induction ceremony Love delivered a hostile speech, criticizing McCartney, Bruce Springsteen, Billy Joel, and Mick Jagger. When asked in 2016 if he regretted anything about the night, Love said, "Yeah, I regret that I didn't meditate [earlier that day]."

In 1992, Love, along with Jardine and several Wilson family members, sued Brian for defamation regarding claims made in his 1991 memoir Wouldn't It Be Nice: My Own Story. The case was settled out of court by publisher HarperCollins, who awarded Love $1.5 million. It was the first of numerous lawsuits that Love would file against Brian. Two years later, Love won a legal proceeding to establish what he considered to be proper authorship credit for many of the Beach Boys songs he co-wrote. Love successfully argued that Murry Wilson avoided crediting him with his early lyrical contributions to Brian's songs, denying Love accrued royalties. He later called it "almost certainly the largest case of fraud in music history".

Later years

After the death of Carl Wilson in 1998, Love continued to tour with the Beach Boys, along with Bruce Johnston and a supporting band of new musicians, occasionally including actor John Stamos. He leased exclusive rights to tour under the Beach Boys name in a boardroom settlement with Brother Records, the Beach Boys' company. However, former bandmate Jardine had been touring under the banners "Beach Boys Family & Friends," "Al Jardine, Beach Boy" and "Al Jardine of the Beach Boys" during this time and Love decided to sue him in order to prevent the use of the name. In the lawsuit the courts ruled in Love's favor, denying Jardine the use of the Beach Boys name in any fashion. Jardine proceeded to appeal this decision in addition to seeking $4 million in damages. The California Court of Appeal proceeded to rule that, "Love acted wrongfully in freezing Jardine out of touring under the Beach Boys name", allowing Jardine to continue with his lawsuit. The case ended up being settled outside of court with the terms not disclosed.

In 2000, ABC premiered a two-part television miniseries, The Beach Boys: An American Family, that dramatized the Beach Boys' story. It was produced by Stamos and was criticized for historical inaccuracies. Love was an advisor to the film. Some critics accused him of having the film overstate his role in the group and portray negative depictions of Brian and Smile collaborator Van Dyke Parks.

On November 3, 2005, Love sued Brian and the British newspaper The Mail On Sunday because the Beach Boys' name and Love's image were used in a promotional CD that was given free with the paper to promote the 2004 Brian Wilson presents Smile release. Love argued that the unauthorized (by Brother Records Inc.) free CD resulted in loss of income for the band. Wilson's wife Melinda alleged that, during the deposition, Love turned to Wilson and remarked, "you better start writing a real big hit because you’re going to have to write me a real big check." The lawsuit was dismissed on May 16, 2007, on the grounds that it was without merit.

In 2011, Love reunited with Brian, Jardine, Johnston and David Marks for a new Beach Boys album and 50th anniversary tour beginning in 2012. In September 2012, Love and Johnston announced via a press release that following the end of the reunion tour the Beach Boys would revert to the Love/Johnston lineup, without Brian, Jardine or Marks, all of whom expressed surprise. Although such dates were noted in a late June issue of Rolling Stone, it was widely reported that the three had been "fired".

Love's autobiography, Good Vibrations: My Life as a Beach Boy, was published on September 13, 2016. He wrote the book as a response to "many inaccuracies" that had been said about him over the decades. It was published one month before the release of Brian's autobiography, I Am Brian Wilson: A Memoir. When asked about the book's negative comments toward him, Love responded: "He's not in charge of his life, like I am mine. His every move is orchestrated and a lot of things he's purported to say, there's not tape of it." As of November 2016, Love has not read Brian's book.

On November 17, 2017, Love released his second solo album Unleash the Love. On October 26, 2018, Love released his third solo album, Reason for the Season, featuring traditional and original Christmas music. Love's fourth album 12 Sides Of Summer was released on July 19, 2019.

Personal life

Marriages and family
Love has been married to Jacquelyne Piesen since 1994 and has eight children: two with Piesen and six from his four previous marriages. As of 2015, he resides in Incline Village, Nevada on the northern shore of Lake Tahoe. Love is a vegetarian who practices and teaches TM, wears Indian Ayurveda rings, and partakes in traditional Hindu ceremonies.

In addition to being a cousin of the Wilson brothers, Love is the brother of former NBA basketball player Stan Love, and Pink Martini harpist Maureen Love, and the uncle of Miami Heat basketball player Kevin Love. Shawn Marie Love, a woman who was engaged to Dennis Wilson in his final days alleged to be Love's daughter, an accusation that Love denied.

Political views

Love describes himself as a progressive, although a photographed handshake between him and Ronald Reagan in the 1980s led many to label him as a conservative. Notwithstanding the friendly relationship between the Beach Boys and George H. W. Bush for many years, in 1992 the band raised money for the TM-backed Natural Law Party. At the time, Love announced he was switching his support from Bush to NLP candidate John Hagelin.

In 2018, Love praised Donald Trump for his "support of music historically" and was present at the signing of the Music Modernization Act in October. After Trump's election, the Beach Boys were asked to perform in the festivities for Trump's inauguration, and Love initially responded positively, saying Trump had "been a friend for a long time. Does that mean I agree with everything he says? No. But... if we were asked [to play his inauguration], I’m sure that we would." Instead, during the evening of Trump's inauguration day, Love's Beach Boys performed at the Texas State Society's "Black Tie & Boots" Inaugural Ball.

In February 2020, Brian Wilson and Jardine's official social media pages encouraged fans to boycott the band's music on animal rights grounds, after it was announced that Love's Beach Boys would perform at a Safari Club International convention in Reno, Nevada. The concert proceeded despite online protests; Love issued a statement that his group has always supported "freedom of thought and expression as a fundamental tenet of our rights as Americans."  
In October 2020, Love's Beach Boys agreed to play as the headliner at a high-dollar fundraiser for Trump's reelection campaign in Newport Beach. In a press release, Wilson and Jardine disavowed the use of the Beach Boys' name and music at the event, stating "we have absolutely nothing to do with the Trump benefit today in Newport Beach. Zero." Love again played at Mar-a-Lago's New Year's Eve celebration that year, alongside other acts.

Charity 
Love has been a longtime supporter of environmental causes and was among speakers at the Earth Summit in Rio de Janeiro in 1992 and Earth Day 2000 in Washington, DC. He was instrumental in forming StarServe ("Students Taking Action and Responsibility to Serve"), which enlisted high-profile celebrities to inspire America's youth to help serve their communities. He also created the Love Foundation, which supports national environmental and educational initiatives. Love personally donated $100,000 to the American Red Cross to benefit the victims of Hurricane Katrina and helped the foundation raise an additional $250,000. He has served as a member of the board of directors of the Lake Tahoe School in Incline Village, Nevada, and was responsible for raising over $1 million to benefit the school.

In 2010, Love contributed to the Juvenile Diabetes Research Foundation's More Hope For The Holidays album with vocals on "Closing of the Year" as well as contributing his self-penned "Santa's Goin' To Kokomo". On the album he appears alongside Weezer, Brandi Carlile, and Creedence Clearwater Revisited. Proceeds benefit the Juvenile Diabetes Research Foundation. He performed a benefit concert for the foundation for the Children of the Californias which raised one million dollars to support the expansion of three new surgical suites. During the 50th Reunion Tour, Love, alongside the Beach Boys, partnered with Operation Smile to raise funds for those in need of cleft lip and palate repair surgeries. In May 2013, he was recognized for his decades of investment in education and national service by being awarded City Year's "Seven Generations Award".

Awards and honors
 2014: Society of Singers Lifetime Achievement Award.

Discography

Studio albums
 1981: Looking Back with Love
 2017: Unleash the Love: Billboard Independent Albums – #37 
 2018: Reason for the Season: Billboard's Holiday Album Chart – #4 and Independent Albums Chart – #6
 2019: 12 Sides of Summer

With Celebration
 1978: Almost Summer: Music from the Original Motion Picture Score
 1979: Celebration
 1979: Disco Celebration

Other albums
 1996: Catch a Wave (with Adrian Baker)
 1998: Salute NASCAR (with Bruce Johnston, David Marks, and Adrian Baker)
 2001: Summertime Cruisin (with Bruce Johnston and Adrian Baker)
 Unreleased: First Love
 Unreleased: Country Love
 Unreleased: Mike Love Not War

Singles
 1967: "Gettin' Hungry" b/w "Devoted to You" (with Brian Wilson)
 1978: "Almost Summer" b/w "Island Girl" (with Celebration) – #28 Billboard Hot 100
 1978: "It's Ok" b/w "Lookin' Good" (with Celebration)
 1979: "Starbaby" b/w "Getting Hungry" (with Celebration)
 1981: "Looking Back with Love" b/w "One Good Reason"
 1981: "Runnin' Around the World" b/w "One Good Reason"
 1982: "Be My Baby" b/w "Teach Me Tonight"
 1982: "Be True to Your Bud" b/w "Be True to Your Bud" (Instrumental) (Released as Mike & Dean) with Dean Torrence
 1982: "Da Doo Ron Ron" b/w "Baby Talk" (Released as Mike & Dean) with Dean Torrence
 1983: "Jingle Bell Rock" b/w "Let's Party" (released as Mike Love & Dean Torrence)
 1983: "Jingle Bells" by Paul Revere & the Raiders b/w "Jingle Bell Rock" (released as Mike Love & Dean Torrence)
 2006: "Santa's Goin' to Kokomo"
 2007: "Hungry Heart"
 2015: "(You'll Never Be) Alone on Christmas Day"
 2017: "Do It Again" (with Mark McGrath & John Stamos)
 2017: "Unleash the Love"
 2017: "All the Love in Paris" (with Dave Koz)
 2017: "Darlin'" (with AJR)
 2018: "It's OK" (with Hanson)
 2020: "This Too Shall Pass" (with John Stamos)

References

Bibliography

External links
Beach Boys Band – current touring band

Mike Love's website
Mike Love Fan Club

 
1941 births
Living people
American male composers
21st-century American composers
American male singer-songwriters
American rock singers
American baritones
American rock saxophonists
American male saxophonists
Tambourine players
American people of Swedish descent
The Beach Boys members
Musicians from Los Angeles
Record producers from California
Wilson family (The Beach Boys)
People from Hawthorne, California
People from Baldwin Hills, Los Angeles
21st-century American saxophonists
Susan Miller Dorsey High School alumni
Transcendental Meditation exponents
Singer-songwriters from California